The 2010 Yale Bulldogs football team represented Yale University in the 2010 NCAA Division I FCS football season. The Bulldogs were led by second-year head coach Tom Williams and played their home games at the Yale Bowl in New Haven, Connecticut. They completed the season at 7–3 overall, 5–2 in Ivy League play to finish in a tie for second place.

Schedule

References

Yale
Yale Bulldogs football seasons
Yale Bulldogs football